Events in the year 2018 in Fiji.

Incumbents
President: George Konrote
Prime Minister: Frank Bainimarama

Events

13 February – Fiji hit by the Cyclone Gita

Scheduled
2018 Fijian general election

Deaths
27 January – Mereoni Vibose, athlete (b. 1951).
4 October – Konisi Yabaki, 77, politician, Minister for Fisheries and Forests 2001–2006.

References

 
2010s in Fiji
Years of the 21st century in Fiji
Fiji
Fiji